Lamarck Island may refer to:

Lamarck Island (Antarctica) 
Lamarck Island (Western Australia)